Pier Carola Pagani (born 10 November 1963) is a former Italian racewalker who was in the top eight at the 1992 European Athletics Indoor Championships in the 3000 m walk.

Achievements
Senior

National titles
Pagani won a national championship at individual senior level.
 Italian Athletics Indoor Championships
 3000 m walk: 1988

See also
 Italian team at the running events
 Italy at the IAAF World Race Walking Cup

References

External links
 
 Pier Carola Pagani at Marcia dal mondo 

1963 births
Living people
Italian female racewalkers
Sportspeople from Bergamo